Ghent Kangri (or Mount Ghent, Ghaint I) is a high peak near the north end of the Saltoro Mountains, a subrange of the Karakoram range. It is located west of the Siachen Glacier near the Actual Ground Position Line between India and Pakistan.

Ghent Kangri was first climbed on 4 June 1961, by Wolfgang Axt, a member of an Austrian expedition led by Erich Waschak, via the West Ridge. He climbed solo above the high camp.

According to the Himalayan Index, there have been three subsequent ascents of the peak, in 1977, 1980, and 1984.

See also

 Near the AGPL (Actual Ground Position Line)
 NJ9842, LoC ends and AGPL begins
 Gyong La
 Chumik Glacier
 Saltoro Mountains
 Saltoro Kangri
 Bilafond La
 Sia La
 Indira Col, AGPL ends at LAC

 Borders
 Actual Ground Position Line (AGPL)
 India–Pakistan International Border {IB)
 Line of Control {LoC)
 Line of Actual Control (LAC)
 Sir Creek (SC)
 Borders of China
 Borders of India
 Borders of Pakistan

 Conflicts
 Kashmir conflict
 Siachen conflict
 Sino-Indian conflict
 List of disputed territories of China
 List of disputed territories of India
 List of disputed territories of Pakistan
 Northern Areas
 Trans-Karakoram Tract

 Operations
 Operation Meghdoot, by India
 Operation Rajiv, by India
 Operation Safed Sagar, by India

 Other related topics
 Awards and decorations of the Indian Armed Forces
 Bana Singh, after whom Quaid Post was renamed to Bana Top 
 Dafdar, westernmost town in Trans-Karakoram Tract
 India-China Border Roads
 Sino-Pakistan Agreement for transfer of Trans-Karakoram Tract to China

References

Sources
 
 Jerzy Wala, Orographical Sketch Map of the Karakoram, Swiss Foundation for Alpine Research, 1990.

Mountains of Ladakh
Seven-thousanders of the Karakoram